Earnock High School in Hamilton, South Lanarkshire served students in and around the Earnock area from 1957 to 2007. The school was closed in June 2007 and merged with Blantyre High to form Calderside Academy. A housing development, Earnock Glen, now occupies the site.

Fire

On 21 June 2008, at around 1.50am, the disused building of Earnock High was set alight. Both the Science and Main Teaching Blocks were extensively damaged — with damage to all three floors in each. At the height of the blaze around thirty firefighters were tackling it — aided by five fire engines and two aerial appliances.

Footnotes

External links
Earnock High School (tagged articles) at Historic Hamilton

Defunct secondary schools in South Lanarkshire
1957 establishments in Scotland
Educational institutions established in 1957
Buildings and structures in Hamilton, South Lanarkshire
Buildings and structures demolished in 2008
Buildings and structures completed in 1957
2007 disestablishments in Scotland
Educational institutions disestablished in 2007